Belarus will compete at the 2009 World Championships in Athletics from 15–23 August. A team of 26 athletes was announced in preparation for the competition. Selected athletes have achieved one of the competition's qualifying standards. Among the stronger members of the team are reigning Olympic hammer throw champion Aksana Miankova and 2008 Olympic silver medallists Andrei Krauchanka and Natallia Mikhnevich.

Team selection

Track and road events

Field and combined events

Results

Men
Track and road events

Field events

Women
Track and road events

Field and combined events

References

External links
Official competition website

Nations at the 2009 World Championships in Athletics
World Championships in Athletics
Belarus at the World Championships in Athletics